In enzymology, a dolichol kinase is an enzyme that catalyzes the chemical reaction

CTP + dolichol  CDP + dolichyl phosphate

Thus, the two substrates of this enzyme are CTP and dolichol, whereas its two products are CDP and dolichyl phosphate.

This enzyme belongs to the family of transferases, to be specific, those transferring phosphorus-containing groups (phosphotransferases) with an alcohol group as acceptor.  The systematic name of this enzyme class is CTP:dolichol O-phosphotransferase. This enzyme is also called dolichol phosphokinase.  This enzyme participates in N-glycan biosynthesis.

In humans dolichol kinase is encoded by the DOLK gene.

Function 

Dolichyl monophosphate is an essential glycosyl carrier lipid for C- and O-mannosylation and N-glycosylation of proteins and for biosynthesis of glycosylphosphatidylinositol anchors in endoplasmic reticulum (ER). Dolichol kinase catalyzes CTP-mediated phosphorylation of dolichol, the terminal step in de novo dolichyl monophosphate biosynthesis.

Clinical significance 

Mutations in DOLK cause a subtype of the congenital disorders of glycosylation, DOLK-CDG (CDG-Im).

See also
 Dolichol kinase deficiency

References

Further reading

External links
  GeneReviews/NCBI/NIH/UW entry on Congenital Disorders of Glycosylation Overview

EC 2.7.1
Enzymes of unknown structure